The Golden Horse Award for Best Original Screenplay is given at the Golden Horse Film Awards.

Winners and nominees

1990s

2000s

2010s

External links 
 Official website 
 Official website 

Golden Horse Film Awards